Minnetonka is a city in Hennepin County, Minnesota, United States. At the 2020 census, the city's population was 53,781. 

Minnetonka is the home of Cargill, the country's largest privately owned company, and UnitedHealth Group, the state's largest publicly owned company. Interstate 494 runs through the city while Interstate 394 (U.S. Route 12) and U.S. Route 169 are situated along the suburb's northern and eastern boundaries respectively.

History
Since the mid-19th century, Minnetonka has evolved from heavily wooded wilderness through extensive farming and industrialization to its present primarily residential suburban character. The Minnetonka area was home to the Dakota and Ojibwe Native American tribes before Euro-Americans arrived in the 1800s.  They believed Lake Minnetonka (mni meaning water, and tanka meaning big, anglicized to Minnetonka) and the land around it to be sacred.  The first recorded exploration of the area by Euro-Americans was in 1822, when a group from newly constructed Fort Snelling made its way up Minnehaha Creek (then known as Brown's Creek or Falls Creek) to the lake.  In 1851, the Dakota sold the area including Minnetonka to the United States with the Treaty of Traverse des Sioux.  The first census, the Territorial Census of 1857, lists 41 households. Twenty-nine of the heads of households are listed as farmers. The occupations of the remaining twelve are associated with the operations of Minnetonka Mill and a nearby hotel.

In 1852, a claim was staked on Minnehaha Creek near McGinty Road.  The sawmill that was constructed in the thick woods of maple, oak, elm, red cedar and basswood was the first privately operated mill in Minnesota west of the Mississippi River.  Oak timbers from this mill were used to build the first suspension bridge across the Mississippi River at Saint Anthony Falls in 1853.  The settlement of Minnetonka Mills that grew up around the mill was the first permanent European–American settlement west of Minneapolis in Hennepin County.  In 1855, a two-story sawmill was constructed with a furniture factory on the second floor. A building for varnishing furniture was built on the south side of the creek, at the present Bridge Street.  Production consisted mainly of chairs and bedsteads.

In 1860, after only 8 years of operation, the sawmill closed. In 1869, a flour and grist mill were constructed and operated until the late 1880s. In 1874, Charles H. Burwell came to manage the Minnetonka Mill Company, and he built a Victorian home on the north bank of Minnehaha Creek (Minnetonka Boulevard at McGinty Road East) for his family. The Charles H. Burwell House is now on the National Register of Historic Places and is owned by the city. A grist mill built on Purgatory Creek was washed out in a flood shortly after construction. Minnetonka Mills, with its post office and port for Lake Minnetonka, was the principal business and trading center for a large area until the 1870s.

Between 1883 and 1956, the area within the original  township grew smaller as Wayzata, Hopkins, Deephaven, Woodland and Saint Louis Park incorporated or annexed portions of then-Minnetonka Township.

Until as late as the 1960s, many portions of Minnetonka were still rural in character, with horse pasture and farms. Those final areas have since been developed with the city now a fully developed suburban community.

The Minnetonka Town Hall, built in 1906, is on the National Register of Historic Places.

Geography
Part of the city includes the eastern tip of Lake Minnetonka, one of the largest lakes in Minnesota. The outlet of Lake Minnetonka is Minnehaha Creek, which winds through south Minneapolis and flows over Minnehaha Falls and into the Mississippi River.

Economy
The headquarters of Carlson are in Minnetonka. The headquarters of Cargill are located in Minnetonka and are in the Wayzata Post Office area. Founded in 1865, Cargill is the largest privately held corporation in the U.S. in terms of revenue. Other companies based in Minnetonka include Digital River, Radisson Hotel Group, and the uniform companies AmeriPride Services and G&K Services.

Top employers
According to the city's 2021 Comprehensive Annual Financial Report, the top employers in the city are:

Education

Public schools
The city of Minnetonka is covered by three independent school districts. The Hopkins School District, which encompasses the central and eastern part of Minnetonka; the Minnetonka School District, in the western part of city north of Lake Minnetonka; and the Wayzata School District, which covers an area along the northern boundary of the city. Some students attend public schools in other school districts chosen by their families under Minnesota's open enrollment statute.

The Minnetonka School District also includes four schools outside of the city of Minnetonka: Deephaven Elementary School (Deephaven), Excelsior Elementary School (Excelsior), Minnewashta Elementary School (Shorewood), and Minnetonka Middle School West (Chanhassen).

The Hopkins School District comprises two-thirds of the city of Minnetonka, the entirety of Hopkins, and portions of the cities of Golden Valley, Edina, St. Louis Park, Wayzata, and Plymouth. In addition to schools located within Minnetonka, the Hopkins School District also includes four schools in the cities of Hopkins and Golden Valley: 
Eisenhower Elementary School/Xin Xing Academy (Hopkins), Alice Smith Elementary School (Hopkins), Meadowbrook Elementary School (Golden Valley), and Harley Hopkins Early Childhood/Family Center (Hopkins).

Private schools
There are three private and parochial schools within Minnetonka's city limits:
 Accell Academy, an accredited private college preparatory school serving grades K-12
 Notre Dame Academy, preschool through eighth grade
 Minnetonka Christian Academy

Public libraries
The Hennepin County Library has its headquarters in the Ridgedale Library in Minnetonka. The system also operates the Minnetonka Library.

Demographics

2010 census
As of the census of 2010, there were 49,734 people, 21,901 households, and 13,619 families living in the city. The racial makeup of the city was 90.0% White, 3.7% African American, 0.3% Native American, 3.1% Asian, 0.7% from other races, and 2.1% from two or more races. Hispanic or Latino of any race were 2.4% of the population.

There were 21,901 households, of which 25.9% had children under the age of 18 living with them, 52.1% were married couples living together, 7.3% had a female householder with no husband present, 2.8% had a male householder with no wife present, and 37.8% were non-families. 31.1% of all households were made up of individuals, and 11.9% had someone living alone who was 65 years of age or older. The average household size was 2.25 and the average family size was 2.85.

The median age in the city was 45 years. 20.8% of residents were under the age of 18; 6% were between the ages of 18 and 24; 23.2% were from 25 to 44; 33.3% were from 45 to 64; and 16.7% were 65 years of age or older. The gender makeup of the city was 47.5% male and 52.5% female.

2000 census
As of the census of 2000, there were 51,301 people, 21,393 households, and 14,097 families living in the city. The population density was 1,893.0 persons per square mile (729.7/km). The racial makeup of the city was 94.40% White, 1.50% African American, 0.20% Native American, 2.29% Asian, 0.03% Pacific Islander, 0.57% from other races, and 1.03% from two or more races. Hispanic or Latino of any race were 1.28% of the population. 24.7% were of German, 13.8% Norwegian, 9.1% Irish, 8.2% Swedish and 6.7% English ancestry.

There were 21,393 households, out of which 29.1% had children under the age of 18 living with them, 56.6% were married couples living together, 6.8% had a female householder with no husband present, and 34.1% were non-families. 27.3% of all households were made up of single individuals and 9.3% had someone living alone who was 65 years of age or older.  The average household size was 2.37 and the average family size was 2.92.

In the city, the population was spread out, with 23.1% under the age of 18, 6.0% from 18 to 24, 28.5% from 25 to 44, 28.4% from 45 to 64, and 14.0% who were 65 years of age or older.  The median age was 41 years. For every 100 females, there were 91.8 males.  For every 100 females age 18 and over, there were 88.7 males.

According to the 2000 census, the median income for a household in the city was $83,437.

Government

The City Council of Minnetonka consists of the mayor and six council members. Of the six council members, two are elected at large and the remaining four are elected from wards. The council exercises the legislative power of the city and determines all matters of policy. It has the responsibility of basic decisions for the community, including appointment of the city manager. The city manager is responsible for putting council policies into effect and administering affairs of city government.

The United States Postal Service operates the Minnetonka Post Office and the Minnetonka Carrier Annex. In addition, Minnetonka is served by four zip codes: one representing Minnetonka (55345), two representing Hopkins and Minnetonka (55305, 55343) and one representing Wayzata (55391).

Politics
Minnetonka is located in Minnesota's 3rd congressional district, represented by Democrat Dean Phillips.

Sports
The Minnetonka Dynamo, a bandy club, became national champions of bandy in 1994, 1998 and 2000.

The Minnetonka Millers, a Class A baseball club, became state champions in 2015, 2016, and 2017. The Millers play at Veterans Field, located on the campus of Minnetonka High School.

Notable people
 Beau Allen – Defensive Tackle, NFL, Tampa Bay Buccaneers
 Douglas Ewald - Minnesota state legislator
 Eric Freeman – former actor
 Jake Gardiner – professional hockey player currently with the Carolina Hurricanes
 Jack Hillen – retired professional ice hockey player
 Kris Humphries – retired professional basketball player. 
 Gary Jacobson – professional golfer.
 Ryan McCartan – Disney channel actor
 Sidney Morin – professional ice hockey player currently with HV71
 Tom Petters – former CEO of Petters Group Worldwide convicted of running a 3.65 billion dollar Ponzi scheme.
 Al Quie – former Governor of Minnesota (1979–1983)
 Gretchen Quie – artist and former First Lady of Minnesota (1979–1983)
 Mike Ramsey – member of United States 1980 Olympic Gold Medal hockey team, the "Miracle Team"
 Terrell Sinkfield – American football cornerback who is currently a free agent
 Dave Snuggerud – professional ice hockey player drafted by the Buffalo Sabres
 Wesley So – Chess Grandmaster
 David Stenshoel — musician (Boiled in Lead)
 Judy Traub – Minnesota state senator and community volunteer
 Jill Trenary – professional figure skater
 Will Leer – professional runner

References

External links

 City website
 Minnetonka Historical Society

 
Cities in Hennepin County, Minnesota
Cities in Minnesota
Populated places established in 1956
Dakota toponyms
1956 establishments in Minnesota